John Donald Audsley (24 October 1892 – 24 December 1942) was an Australian rules footballer who played with Geelong in the Victorian Football League (VFL).

After his brief football career Audsley served in Egypt, Belgium and France during World War I, being wounded twice and suffering trench fever and influenza.

Notes

External links 

1892 births
1942 deaths
Australian rules footballers from Victoria (Australia)
Geelong Football Club players
East Geelong Football Club players
Australian military personnel of World War I